Svitlana Nianio (Ukrainian: Світлана Няньо) is a Ukrainian avant-garde singer-songwriter. She was previously a member of the Kyiv experimental group Cukor Bila Smerť (lit. Sugar White Death). In addition, she produced albums with experimental musician Oleksandr Yurchenko. During the early 1990s she was known as Svitlana Ohrimenko (Світлана Охріменко).

Biography 
Little is known about Svitlana Nianio's background. In an interview with RWCDAX, she states that her parents were Catholic and that she grew up with an interest in religious and traditional music. She went on to attend a music conservatory in Kyiv, where she formed Tsukor bila smertʹ in 1988 with Eugene Taran, Oleksandr Kochanovsky, and Tamila Mazur. The group disbanded in 1993.

After the end of Tsukor bila smertʹ she worked on music independently. Notably, she produced two albums with Oleksandr Yuchenko. In 1999 she released her first solo credited album Kytytsi on Koka Records. She struggled to find concerts after the "Music The World Does Not See" concert series in 2000, leading to her disappearance from the public eye.

Nianio's music saw a major international resurgence in interest during the 2010s, leading to the reissue of some of her albums and a return to public performing beginning in 2017, including a livestream during the COVID-19 pandemic.

References 

Ukrainian singer-songwriters
21st-century Ukrainian women singers
Living people
Year of birth missing (living people)
20th-century Ukrainian women singers